Višnjevo is a village in the municipality of Gacko, Republika Srpska, Bosnia and Herzegovina.

Population

Ethnic structure, Census 1991.

total: 24

 Serbs - 24 (100%)

References

Villages in Republika Srpska
Populated places in Gacko